The 1948 NYU Violets football team was an American football team that represented New York University as an independent during the 1948 college football season. 

In their second season under head coach Edward "Hook" Mylin, the Violets compiled a 3–6 record, and were outscored 190–96.

The team played one home game at Yankee Stadium in The Bronx, with the rest of its schedule on the road. NYU played no games at its on-campus home field, Ohio Field in University Heights, Bronx

Schedule

References

NYU
NYU Violets football seasons
NYU Violets football